During the 2005–06 English football season, Crewe Alexandra F.C. competed in the Football League Championship, their 83rd season in the English Football League.

Season summary
In the 2005–06 season, Crewe Alexandra's continued success in the Championship finally came to an end and despite a gallant effort in the second half of the season, the Railwaymen eventually finished in 22nd place and were relegated with Millwall and Brighton. Their relegation was confirmed on 17 April 2006 after a 1–1 draw at home with Cardiff City after Sheffield Wednesday won 2–0 at Brighton. The season did see some highs though with the club securing Algerian international Madjid Bougherra and the former Welsh international Gareth Taylor on loan from Nottingham Forest.

Final league table

Results
Crewe Alexandra's score comes first

Legend

Football League Championship

FA Cup

League Cup

Squad

Left club during season

References

Crewe Alexandra F.C. seasons
Crewe Alexandra